Mark Katic (born May 9, 1989) is a Canadian professional ice hockey player. Katic is currently playing for Adler Mannheim in the Deutsche Eishockey Liga (DEL). Katic played previously with the New York Islanders of the National Hockey League (NHL). Katic is of Croatian descent.

Playing career
Katic was selected by the New York Islanders in the third round (62nd overall) of the 2007 NHL Entry Draft.

He made his NHL debut on February 24, 2011, when he was called up from the Bridgeport Sound Tigers, on an emergency basis, to play defence in an away game against the Philadelphia Flyers. In his first NHL game he recorded an assist and logged 15:37 of ice time, although the Flyers beat the Islanders 4–3 in overtime.

On July 4, 2012, it was announced that Katic has signed a contract with six time German champion Eisbären Berlin. He helped the Eisbären team win the 2012-13 national German championship.

On June 12, 2013, it was announced that Katic has signed a contract with KHL Medveščak Zagreb from Croatia, newest member of KHL. In December 2016, Katic won the Spengler Cup with Team Canada. He left Zagreb on February 13, 2017, and transferred to Skellefteå AIK of the Swedish Hockey League (SHL). In the 2017–18 campaign, Katic won silver in the SHL.

In April 2018, Katic inked a two-year deal with German DEL side, Adler Mannheim.

Career statistics

Awards and honours

References

External links

1989 births
Living people
Adler Mannheim players
Bridgeport Sound Tigers players
Canadian ice hockey defencemen
Canadian people of Croatian descent
Eisbären Berlin players
Ice hockey people from Ontario
KHL Medveščak Zagreb players
New York Islanders draft picks
New York Islanders players
Sarnia Sting players
Skellefteå AIK players
Sportspeople from Timmins
Canadian expatriate ice hockey players in Croatia
Canadian expatriate ice hockey players in Germany
Canadian expatriate ice hockey players in Sweden